The retroflex ejective fricative is a type of consonantal sound, used in some spoken languages.

Features
Features of the retroflex ejective fricative:

Occurrence

See also
 Index of phonetics articles

External links
 

Fricative consonants
Alveolar consonants
Lateral consonants
Ejectives
Oral consonants
Central consonants